VUT may refer to:

Vanuatu, an island nation in the South Pacific Ocean
Vaal University of Technology, Gauteng Province, South Africa
Vysoké učení technické v Brně, the Brno University of Technology in Brno, Czech Republic
 Victoria University of Technology, former name of Victoria University, Australia